"Rags2Riches" is a song by American rapper and singer Rod Wave, released in April 2020 as part of his second studio album Pray 4 Love. The track features American rapper ATR Son Son. It garnered popularity on video-sharing app TikTok, being featured in over 5 million videos as of July 2020. An alternate version titled "Rags2Riches 2" featuring Lil Baby was included on the deluxe edition of Pray 4 Love, released August 7, 2020.

Background
The song was recorded at a hotel while Rod Wave was touring.
Comparing the song to another album track, "Ribbons In the Sky", Micah Peters of The Ringer said "Rags2Riches" is "inspiring without being so melodramatic". HotNewHipHops Alexander Cole called Lil Baby's feature on "Rags2Riches 2" a standout and said the song "comes across like a ballad of sorts, as both artists go in-depth on their success and how they grew up with nothing".

Charts

Weekly charts

Rags2Riches

Year-end charts

Rags2Riches 2

Certifications

References

2020 songs
Rod Wave songs
Lil Baby songs
Songs written by Rod Wave